The Amnye Machen Institute is based in Dharamshala working in the field of Tibetan studies. It began along liberal and humanist lines, focusing primarily on secular subjects with emphasis on the contemporary and the neglected aspects of Tibetan culture and history.

History 
The Amnye Machen Institute was founded on July 16, 1992 in Dharamshala, Himachal Pradesh, India by Tashi Tsering, Pema Bhum, Jamyang Norbu and Lhasang Tsering. The institute aimed at advancing an international and secular culture within traditional Tibetan society.

The institute started with the blessing and Rs. 50,000 seed money from the Dalai Lama and became the central point of intellectual and social movement in the exile community. They started fortnightly newspaper called Mangtso and publish scholarly magazine called Lungta.

Objectives 
The institute focuses on addressing the limitations of the Tibetan people inside and outside Tibet in the intellectual, social and cultural life by undertaking scientific studies into Tibetan history, culture, society and politics.

The Amnye Machen Institute explores external cultures, ideologies and nations that have influenced the Tibetan history and search for a new path in Tibetan studies by focusing on contemporary Tibetan art, literature and women's studies.

Significance 
The institute studies the past to understand and direct Tibetan people to prepare for the future, through raising cultural and intellectual awareness, by making literature, culture and scientific knowledge readily available.

It provides service and platform to various writers, academics, poets, artists and musicians for their creative growth and promotes their work.

Award 
The institute was awarded the Poul Lauritzen Prize for Freedom award in 1994 and 1996.

List of founding directors 

 Lhasang Tsering
 Jamyang Norbu
 Pema Bhum
 Tashi Tsering (current director)

Publications 

 Trails Of The Tibetan Tradition: Papers for Elliot Sperling
 Forty-five Years of Tibetan Studies: An Anthology of Articles by Per Kvaerne
 The Centennial of the Tibeto-Mongol Treaty, 1913–2013
 A Short History of Mustang
 Pandita and the Siddha: Tibetan Studies in Honor of E. Gene Smith
 Tibetan Studies in Honour of Samten Karmay

References 

1992 establishments in Himachal Pradesh
Schools in Himachal Pradesh